The broadnose catshark (Apristurus investigatoris) is a catshark of the family Scyliorhinidae, the holotype and only specimen being found in deep water in the Andaman Sea in the Indian Ocean between 16 and 10°N. Its length is around 26 cm, although this measurement was taken from an immature specimen. The reproduction of this catshark is oviparous. The threats are not exactly known but it may be deepwater fisheries.

References

 

broadnose catshark
Fish of the Indian Ocean
Taxa named by Kamla Sankar Misra
broadnose catshark